Sjeng may refer to:
Sjeng (name), a Dutch given name
Sjeng (software), a chess-and-variants playing program